Mirvis (and variants including Mervis, Mirvish, and Mirviss) is a surname of Lithuanian Jewish origin. The name may refer to:

People
 Matt Mervis (born 1998), American baseball player
 Ephraim Mirvis (born 1956), Orthodox rabbi and Chief Rabbi of the United Hebrew Congregations of the Commonwealth
 Philip H. Mirvis (born 1951), organizational psychologist and writer
 Tova Mirvis (born 1972), American novelist
 Dan Mirvish, American filmmaker and author
 David Mirvish (born 1945), Canadian art collector and theatre producer; son of Ed Mirvish
 Ed Mirvish (1914–2007), Canadian businessman, philanthropist, and theatrical impresario

Places
 Mervis Hall, an academic building at the University of Pittsburgh, in Pennsylvania, United States
 David Mirvish Gallery, an art gallery run by David Mirvish in Toronto from 1963 to 1978
 Ed Mirvish Theatre in Toronto (previous names include the Pantages Theatre, the Imperial Theatre, and the Canon Theatre)
 Ed & Anne Mirvish Parkette, a public park in Toronto, named for Ed Mirvish
 Mirvish Village, a commercial district in Toronto, named for Ed Mirvish

Other uses
 Mirvish Productions, Canada-based theatrical production company founded by David Mirvish
 Mervis Pantry, a fictional character on the animated television series CatDog

Jewish surnames
Surnames of Lithuanian origin